Ganz-MÁVAG Sport Egyesület was a Hungarian football club from the town of Budapest, Hungary.

History
Ganz-MÁVAG Sport Egyesület debuted in the 1945 season of the Hungarian League and finished eleventh.

Name Changes 
1903–1921: Ganzgyári SE (Ganz-gyári Labdarúgó Kör)
1921–1945: Ganz-gyári Torna Egyesület
1945–1945: Ganz VTSE
1945–1950: Ganz-gyári Torna Egyesület
1950–1951: Ganz Vasas
1951–1956: Vasas Ganzvagon SK
1956–1957: Ganz TE
1957–1958: Ganzvagon TE
1958–1959: Vasas Ganzvagon
1959: merger with Budapesti MÁVAG SK 
1959-?: Ganz MÁVAG Vasas SE
?-1988: Ganz MÁVAG SE
1988: merger with Építők SC

References

External links
 Profile

Football clubs in Hungary
Defunct football clubs in Hungary
1909 establishments in Hungary